Gordon Elmo Young (April 26, 1907 – August 20, 1969) was a United States district judge of the United States District Court for the Eastern District of Arkansas.

Education and career

Born in Malvern, Arkansas, Young received a Bachelor of Laws from the University of Arkansas School of Law in 1931. He was in private practice in Malvern from 1931 to 1939, and then in Pine Bluff, Arkansas until 1959.

Federal judicial service

On August 18, 1959, Young was nominated by President Dwight D. Eisenhower to a seat on the United States District Court for the Eastern District of Arkansas vacated by Judge Jesse Smith Henley. Young was confirmed by the United States Senate on September 2, 1959, and received his commission on September 10, 1959. Young served in that capacity until his death on August 20, 1969.

References

Sources
 

1907 births
1969 deaths
Judges of the United States District Court for the Eastern District of Arkansas
United States district court judges appointed by Dwight D. Eisenhower
20th-century American judges
University of Arkansas School of Law alumni
20th-century American lawyers
Arkansas lawyers